Płonka Kościelna  is a village in the administrative district of Gmina Łapy, within Białystok County, Podlaskie Voivodeship, in north-eastern Poland.

The village has a population of 400.

References

Villages in Białystok County